Affirm Press is an independent Melbourne-based book publisher.

History 
In 2010, Affirm Press began publishing several books a year as a part-time operation between Martin Hughes, former editor of The Big Issue, and Graeme Wise, founder of The Body Shop Australia. In 2014 Affirm Press appointed Keiran Rogers as its Sales and Marketing Director, and became a full-time publishing house.

Affirm Press publishes a broad range of non-fiction books and a select fiction list. In 2017 they added a kids list.   

Each year Affirm Press partners with a charity to publish a profit-for-purpose book. These projects have raised hundreds of thousands of dollars and include bestsellers Letters of Love with the Alannah & Madeline Foundation and The Silver Sea by Alison Lester and Jane Godwin.

Awards 
In 2019 Affirm Press was named Small Publisher of the Year at the Australian Book Industry Awards. Its books have won several major awards, including the Stella Prize (The Strays by Emily Bitto), the Booksellers Choice Award (The Birdman’s Wife by Melissa Ashley), and The Children’s Book Council of Australia’s Picture Book of the Year Award (A Walk in the Bush by Gwyn Perkins). In August 2018 Christian White became the fastest-selling Australian debut novelist on record when Affirm Press published his book The Nowhere Child.

Corporate affairs 
Affirm Press’s in-house sales staff are supported by Hachette Australia and New Zealand and its books are distributed by Alliance Distribution Services. The publisher also represents two international publishing houses in Australia and New Zealand: Orenda Books (London) and The Experiment (New York City). Affirm Press sells rights to overseas publishers and audio and film producers, and has a partnership with the prestigious Kaplan/DeFiore Rights Agency (New York City) and Rights People (London).

References 

Publishing companies of Australia
Book publishing companies of Australia
Small press publishing companies
Publishing companies established in 2010